Crinum flaccidum, known variously as the Darling lily, Murray lily or Macquarie lily, is a species of the family Amaryllidae native to inland Australia.  The Darling river people — the Paakantyi — called this plant paalampaltharu.

In the 1889 book The useful native plants of Australia, the botanist Joseph Henry Maiden wrote:
"This exceedingly handsome white-flowered plant, which grows back from the Darling, has bulbs which yield a fair arrowroot.  On one occasion, near the town of Wilcannia, a man earned a handsome sum by making this substance when flour was all but unobtainable.

South Australia, Victoria, New South Wales, and Queensland."
Maiden also gave three synonyms:
Crinum flaccidum Herb.
Amaryllis australasica Ker
Crinum australis Spreng.

References

Flora of New South Wales
Flora of Queensland
Angiosperms of Western Australia
flaccidum
Plants described in 1820